Ajaib Singh Bhatti was deputy speaker of the Punjab Legislative Assembly from 2017 to 2022.

Early life 
A. S. Bhatti started his career as a teacher in rural areas of Bathinda besides working as a Block Development and Panchayat Officer (BDPO) for nearly a year. He joined Punjab Civil Services (executive branch) in 1984 and served in various magisterial and civilian assignments in different parts of the State. He also served  as Additional Deputy Commissioner in Muktsar and Bathinda districts. In 2007 he joined Indian National Congress.

Political career 
First time he contested in 2007 from Nathana Assembly constituency (now called Bhucho Mandi) and won. Second time contested from Bhucho Mandi in 2012 and won. Now, he is the MLA from Malout Assembly constituency.

References

Indian National Congress politicians from Punjab, India
Deputy Speakers of the Punjab Legislative Assembly
Punjab, India MLAs 2007–2012
Punjab, India MLAs 2012–2017
Punjab, India MLAs 2017–2022
People from Moga district
1951 births
Living people
Bharatiya Janata Party politicians from Punjab